TDY may refer to:
 Teledyne Technologies, an American conglomerate (stock symbol TDY)
 Temporary duty assignment, in the US military
 Tour de Yorkshire, a bicycle race in England
 WTDY-FM, a Philadelphia radio station branded as "96.5 TDY"